This article is the Electoral history of Pierre Trudeau, the fifteenth Prime Minister of Canada.

A Liberal, he served two terms as Prime Minister (1968–1979;  1980–1984).  He led the Liberal Party in five general elections, winning four (1968, 1972, 1974 and 1980) and losing one (1979).  He won majority governments in 1968, 1974 and 1980, and a minority government in the 1972 election.  With a total of fifteen years and 164 days in office, he is the third longest serving prime minister, after William Lyon Mackenzie King and Sir John A. Macdonald.

Trudeau succeeded Lester B. Pearson as prime minister in 1968.  After Joe Clark won the 1979 election, Trudeau resigned and became Leader of the Opposition.  The Clark government fell on a budget matter late in 1979 triggering the 1980 election, which returned Trudeau to office with a majority government.  He retired in 1984 and was succeeded as Liberal leader and prime minister by John Turner.

Trudeau stood for election to the House of Commons of Canada six times, all for the riding of Mount Royal in Montreal, Quebec.  He was elected with substantial majorities each time.

Summary 

Trudeau ranks third out of twenty-three prime ministers for time in office, serving two terms totalling fifteen years and 164 days.

Trudeau was the fourth of four prime ministers to serve non-consecutive terms, the others being Sir John A. Macdonald, Arthur Meighen and William Lyon Mackenzie King.

Trudeau was the fourth of eight prime ministers from Quebec, the others being Sir John Abbott, Sir Wilfrid Laurier, Louis St. Laurent, Brian Mulroney, Jean Chrétien, Paul Martin and Justin Trudeau.  He was also the third of five francophone prime ministers, the others being Laurier, St. Laurent, Chrétien, and Justin Trudeau.

Before entering politics, Trudeau was a federal public servant, an academic at the Université de Montréal and a social activist, particularly during the Asbestos Strike and as a founder and frequent contributor to the magazine Cité libre.  Along with two other colleagues from Cité libre, Gerard Pelletier and Jean Marchand, he was invited by Prime Minister Lester Pearson to join the Liberal government in Ottawa to combat the rising Quebec separatism.  Trudeau stood for election in Mount Royal in the general election of 1965, winning the seat.  Pearson appointed him as his parliamentary secretary and then Minister of Justice.  Following Pearson's announcement of his retirement in 1968, Trudeau ran for the leadership of the Liberal party with Pearson's tacit support.   He won the leadership at the Liberal leadership convention of 1968 and became Prime Minister.

Trudeau led the Liberals in five general elections. He was successful in the general elections of 1968, 1972 (albeit with a minority government), and 1974, but was defeated by Joe Clark in the 1979 election.  However, Clark's minority government was defeated late in 1979, triggering another election in early 1980, which Trudeau won.

Trudeau stood for election to the House of Commons six times (in 1965, 1968, 1972, 1974, 1979 and 1980), each time from the riding of Mount Royal, in Montreal, Quebec.  He was elected with substantial majorities each election.  His lowest vote count, in the 1965 election, was 55.6%, out of a field of four candidates.  In his next election, in 1968 at the height of Trudeaumania, he received 90.8% of the votes in the riding.  In the next four elections, he received over 70% in one election (1974), and over 80% of the votes in three elections (1972, 1979 and 1980).  Trudeau served in the House of Commons for 18 years, 7 months and 22 days.

Trudeau won the Liberal leadership at the 1968 Liberal leadership convention, from a field of nine candidates.  Trudeau won on the fourth ballot by the narrow margin of 51.1% over the runner-up, Robert Winters, who had 40.6% of the votes.  Future prime minister John Turner came in third, with 8.3% of the votes.  As Liberal leader, Trudeau then became prime minister.

Federal general elections: 1968 to 1980 
Trudeau led the Liberal Party in five general elections. He won four (1968, 1972, 1974 and 1980) and lost one (1979). He won three majority governments in the 1968, 1974 and 1980 elections, and a minority government in the 1972 election.

Federal general election: 1968 

Trudeau was elected leader of the Liberal Party on April 6, 1968.  He called the election shortly afterwards and won a majority, defeating the Progressive Conservatives led by Robert L. Stanfield.

1 Prime Minister when election was called;  Prime Minister after election.
2  Leader of the Opposition when election was called;  Leader of the Opposition after the election.
3 Table does not include parties which received votes but did not elect any members.

Federal general election: 1972 

Trudeau led the Liberals in the 1972 election and was returned to office, but with a minority government.  Stanfield and the Progressive Conservatives won only two seats less than the Liberals.

1 Prime Minister when election was called;  Prime Minister after election.
2  Leader of the Opposition when election was called;  Leader of the Opposition after the election.
3 Table does not include parties which received votes but did not elect any members.

Federal general election: 1974 

Trudeau led the Liberals in the 1974 election and was returned to office with a majority government, again defeating Stanfield and the Progressive Conservatives.

1 Prime Minister when election was called;  Prime Minister after election.
2  Leader of the Opposition when election was called;  Leader of the Opposition after the election.
3 Table does not include parties which received votes but did not elect any members.

Federal general election: 1979 

Trudeau led the Liberals in the 1979 election and was defeated.  He resigned as Prime Minister.  Joe Clark, the new leader of the Progressive Conservatives, formed a short-lived minority government.

1 Leader of the Opposition when election was called;  Prime Minister after election.
2 Prime Minister when election was called;  Leader of the Opposition after the election.
3 Table does not include parties which received votes but did not elect any members.

Federal general election: 1980 

After the 1979 election, Trudeau indicated he would resign as party leader, but would stay on as interim Leader of the Opposition.  However, before the Liberals could elect a new leader, the Clark government fell in December 1979 when the opposition parties defeated the budget in the Commons.  Trudeau led the Liberals in the resulting election and was returned to power with a majority. Clark became the Leader of the Opposition.

1 Leader of the Opposition when election was called;  Prime Minister after election.
2 Prime Minister when election was called;  Leader of the Opposition after the election.
3 Table does not include parties which received votes but did not elect any members.

Federal constituency elections: 1965 to 1980 

Trudeau stood for election to the House of Commons six times (in 1965, 1968, 1972, 1974, 1979 and 1980). He was elected all six times, each time from the riding of Mount Royal, in Montreal, Quebec.

1965 Federal Election: Mount Royal 

 Elected.

1968 Federal Election: Mount Royal 

 Elected. 
X Incumbent.

1972 Federal Election: Mount Royal 

 Elected. 
X Incumbent.

1974 Federal Election: Mount Royal 

 Elected. 
X Incumbent.

1979 Federal Election: Mount Royal 

 Elected. 
X Incumbent. 
1 Rounding error.

1980 Federal Election: Mount Royal 

 Elected. 
X Incumbent. 
1 Rounding error.

1968 Liberal Party leadership election 

Trudeau won the leadership on the fourth ballot.  His main opponents were Paul Hellyer and Robert Winters, both former ministers in Pearson's governments.

1 Rounding error.

See also 

 Electoral history of Lester B. Pearson  - Trudeau's predecessor as leader of the Liberal Party and as Prime Minister.
 Electoral history of Joe Clark - Trudeau's principal opponent in two general elections, alternating as Prime Minister.
 Electoral history of John Turner - Trudeau's successor as leader of the Liberal Party and as Prime Minister.

References

External links 

  Library of Parliament:  History of Federal Ridings since 1867
 CPAC - 1968 Liberal Convention

Trudeau, Pierre